Blakey Martin MM and Bar (15 November 1891 – 21 October 1940) was an English professional footballer who played as a centre half in the Football League for Southend United, Glossop and Derby County. He played for the Southern League and Western League representative teams.

Personal life 
Martin served as a private in the 63rd (Royal Naval) Division during the First World War and saw action at Gallipoli and on the Western Front. He was awarded the Military Medal and Bar.

Career statistics

References

English footballers
Association football wing halves
English Football League players
1891 births
1940 deaths
Footballers from West Yorkshire
Castleford Town F.C. players
Glossop North End A.F.C. players
Derby County F.C. players
Southend United F.C. players
Llanelli Town A.F.C. players
63rd (Royal Naval) Division soldiers
Royal Navy personnel of World War I
Recipients of the Military Medal
Southern Football League representative players
People from Rastrick
Military personnel from Yorkshire